Martin Whitelaw (born 22 May 1976) is an Australian rules footballer who played for the Fremantle Dockers between 1997 and 1998. He was drafted from West Perth in the WAFL as a zone selection in the 1995 AFL Draft and played as a ruckman.

External links

1976 births
Fremantle Football Club players
West Perth Football Club players
Living people
Australian rules footballers from Western Australia